Telipna rothi, Roth's telipna, is a butterfly in the family Lycaenidae. It is found in Nigeria.

The larvae feed on lichens.

References

Endemic fauna of Nigeria
Butterflies described in 1898
Poritiinae
Taxa named by Henley Grose-Smith
Butterflies of Africa